In France, the President of the Departmental Council (French: Président du Conseil départemental) is the locally elected head of the departmental council, the assembly governing a department in France. The position is elected by the departmental councilors from among their number. If there is a tie, the senior councilor is elected.

As per Articles L1111-1 to L7331-3 of the General code of local and regional authorities, the responsibilities of the President of the Departmental Council include:
 Chairing the departmental authorities
 Preparing and implementing the council's decisions
 Collection of tax revenues 
 Representing the département in legal cases

History
In 1833, a law was enacted that gave each canton (subdivision of a department) representation of a councillor (Conseiller général).

As a result of the decentralisation of government (Deferre law), the election criteria were redefined in 1982 and the President of the Departmental Council took over executive powers from the centrally-appointed prefect.

Women presidents

List of the presidents of the departmental councils

|-
! !! Département (or collectivity) !! President !! Party !! Since
!Ref.
|-
| style="background:#0066cc"| 01
|Ain
|Jean Deguerry
|The Republicans
|2017
|
|-
| style="background:#00ffff;"| 02
|Aisne
|Nicolas Fricoteaux
|Union of Democrats and Independents
|2015
|
|-
| style="background:#00ffff;"| 03
|Allier
|Claude Riboulet
|Union of Democrats and Independents
|2017
|
|-
| style="background:#0066cc;"| 04
|Alpes-de-Haute-Provence
|Éliane Barreille
|The Republicans
|2021
|
|-
| style="background:#0066cc;"| 05
|Hautes-Alpes
|Jean-Marie Bernard
|The Republicans
|2015
|
|-
| style="background:#0066cc;"|06
|Alpes-Maritimes
|Charles-Ange Ginésy
|The Republicans
|2017
|
|-
| style="background:#0066cc;"| 07
|Ardèche
|Olivier Amrane
|The Republicans
|2021
|
|-
| style="background:#0066cc;"|08
|Ardennes
|Noël Bourgeois
|The Republicans
|2017
|
|-
| style="background:#ff8080;"| 09
|Ariège
|Christine Téqui
|Socialist Party
|2021
|
|-
| style="background:#adc1fd;"|10
|Aube
|Philippe Pichery
|Miscellaneous Right
|2017
|
|-
| style="background:#ff8080;"| 11
|Aude
|Hélène Sandragné
|Socialist Party
|2021
|
|-
| style="background:#0066cc;"|12
|Aveyron
|Arnaud Viala
|The Republicans
|2017
|
|-
| style="background:#0066cc;"| 13
|Bouches-du-Rhône
|Martine Vassal
|The Republicans
|2015
|
|-
| style="background:#00ffff;"|14
|Calvados
|Jean-Léonce Dupont
|Union of Democrats and Independents
|2011
|
|-
| style="background:#0066cc;"|15
|Cantal
|Bruno Faure
|The Republicans
|2017
|
|-
| style="background:#adc1fd;"| 16
|Charente
|Philippe Bouty
|Miscellaneous Right
|2015
|
|-{
| style="background:#adc1fd;"|17
|Charente-Maritime
|Sylvie Marcilly
|Miscellaneous Right
|2021
|
|-
| style="background:#0066cc;"| 18
|Cher
|Jacques Fleury
|The Republicans
|2021
|
|-
| style="background:#0066cc;"| 19
|Corrèze
|Pascal Coste
|The Republicans
|2015
|
|-
| style="background:#00ffff;"|21
|Côte-d'Or
|François Sauvadet
|Union of Democrats and Independents
|2008
|
|-
| style="background:#0066cc;"| 22
|Côtes-d'Armor
|Christian Coail
|The Republicans
|2015
|
|-
| style="background:#0066cc;"| 23
|Creuse
|Valérie Simonet
|The Republicans
|2015
|
|-
| style="background:#ff8080;"| 24
|Dordogne
|Germinal Peiro
|Socialist Party
|2015
|
|-
| style="background:#adc1fd;"| 25
|Doubs
|Christine Bouquin
|Miscellaneous Right
|2015
|
|-
| style="background:#0066cc;"| 26
|Drôme
|Marie-Pierre Mouton
|The Republicans
|2017
|
|-
| style="background:";| 27
|Eure
|Sébastien Lecornu
|Renaissance
|2021
|
|-
| style="background:#0066cc;"|28
|Eure-et-Loir
|Christophe Le Dorven
|The Republicans
|2021
|
|-
| style="background:#72A0C1;"| 29
|Finistère
|Maël de Calan
|Union of the Centre and Right
|2021
|
|-
| style="background:#ff8080;"| 30
|Gard
|Françoise Laurent-Perrigot
|Socialist Party
|2021
|
|-
| style="background:#ff8080;"| 31
|Haute-Garonne
|Georges Méric
|Socialist Party
|2015
|
|-
| style="background:#ff8080;"| 32
|Gers
|Philippe Dupouy
|Socialist Party
|2022
|
|-
| style="background:#ff8080;"| 33
|Gironde
|Jean-Luc Gleyze
|Socialist Party
|2015
|
|-
| style="background:#ff8080;"| 34
|Hérault
|Kléber Mesquida
|Socialist Party
|2015
|
|-
| style="background:#ff8080;"| 35
|Ille-et-Vilaine
|Jean-Luc Chenut
|Socialist Party
|2015
|
|-
| style="background:#0066cc;"|36
|Indre
|Marc Fleuret
|The Republicans
|2021
|
|-
| style="background:#72A0C1;"| 37
|Indre-et-Loire
|Jean-Gérard Paumier
|Union of the Centre and Right
|2016
|
|-
| style="background:#0066cc;"| 38
|Isère
|Jean-Pierre Barbier
|The Republicans
|2015
|
|-
| style="background:#adc1fd;"| 39
|Jura
|Clément Pernot
|Miscellaneous Right
|2015
|
|-
| style="background:#ff8080;"| 40
|Landes
|Xavier Fortinon
|Socialist Party
|2017
|
|-
| style="background:;"|41
|Loir-et-Cher
|Philippe Gouet
|Union of Democrats and Independents
|2021
|
|-
| style="background:#0066cc;"|42
|Loire
|George Ziegler
|The Republicans
|2021
|
|-
| style="background:#0066cc;"|43
|Haute-Loire
|Marie-Agnès Petit
|The Republicans
|2014
|
|-
| style="background:#ff8080;"| 44
|Loire-Atlantique
|Michel Ménard
|Socialist Party
|2021
|
|-
| style="background:#adc1fd;"|45
|Loiret
|Marc Gaudet
|Miscellaneous right
|2017
|
|-
| style="background:#ffc0c0;"| 46
|Lot
|Serge Rigal
|Miscellaneous left
|2014
|
|-
| style="background:#ff8080;"| 47
|Lot-et-Garonne
|Sophie Borderie
|Socialist Party
|2015
|
|-
| style="background:#ff8080;"|48
|Lozère
|Sophie Pantel
|Socialist Party
|2015
|
|-
| style="background:#adc1fd;"|49
|Maine-et-Loire
|Florence Dabin
|Miscellaneous Right
|2021
|
|-
| style="background:#adc1fd;"|50
|Manche
|Jean Morin
|Miscellaneous Right
|2021
|
|-
| style="background:#adc1fd;"|51
|Marne
|Christian Bruyen
|Miscellaneous Right
|2017
|
|-
| style="background:;"|52
|Haute-Marne
|Nicolas Lacroix
|The Republicans (France)
|1998
|
|-
| style="background:;"|53
|Mayenne
|Olivier Richefou
|Centrist Alliance
|2014
|
|-
| style="background:#ff8080;"| 54
|Meurthe-et-Moselle
|Chaynesse Khirouni
|Socialist Party
|2021
|
|-
| style="background:#adc1fd;"|55
|Meuse
|Jérôme Dumont
|Miscellaneous Right
|2021
|
|-
|  style="background:#72a0c1;"|56
|Morbihan
|David Lappartient
|Union of the Centre and Right
|2021
|
|-
| style="background:#adc1fd;"| 57
|Moselle
|Patrick Weiten
|Miscellaneous Right
|2011
|
|-
| style="background:#ff8080;"| 58
|Nièvre
|Fabien Bazin
|Socialist Party
|2021
|
|-
| style="background:#ff8080;"| 59
|Nord
|Christian Poiret
|Socialist Party
|2015
|
|-
| style="background:#0066cc;"| 60
|Oise
|Nadège Lefebvre
|The Republicans
|2017
|
|-
| style="background:#0066cc;"|61
|Orne
|Christophe de Balorre
|The Republicans
|2017
|
|-
| style="background:#ff8080;"| 62
|Pas-de-Calais
|Jean-Claude Leroy
|Socialist Party
|2015
|
|-
| style="background:#0066cc;"| 63
|Puy-de-Dôme
|Lionel Chauvin
|The Republicans
|2021
|
|-
| style="background:#ff9900;"| 64
|Pyrénées-Atlantiques
|Jean-Jacques Lasserre
|Democratic Movement
|2015
|
|-
| style="background:#ffd1dc;"|65
|Hautes-Pyrénées
|Michel Pélieu
|Radical Party of the Left
|2011
|
|-
| style="background:#ffc0c0;"| 66
|Pyrénées-Orientales
|Hermeline Malherbe-Laurent
|Miscellaneous Left
|2010
|
|-
| style="background:#0066cc;"| 69
|Rhône
|Christophe Guilloteau
|The Republicans
|2015
|
|-
| style="background:;"| 69M
|Lyon
|Bruno Bernard
|Europe Ecology - The Greens
|2020
|
|-
| style="background:#ff8080;"| 70
|Haute-Saône
|Yves Krattinger
|Socialist Party
|2001
|
|-
| style="background:;"| 71
|Saône-et-Loire
|André Accary
|The Republicans (France)
|2015
|
|-
| style="background:#0066cc;"|72
|Sarthe
|Dominique Le Mèner
|The Republicans
|2015
|
|-
| style="background:#0066cc;"|73
|Savoie
|Hervé Gaymard
|The Republicans
|2008
|
|-
| style="background:#0066cc;"|74
|Haute-Savoie
|Martial Saddier
|The Republicans
|2021
|
|-
| style="background:#ff8080;"| 75
|Paris
|Anne Hidalgo
|Socialist Party
|2014
|
|-
| style="background:;"| 76
|Seine-Maritime
|Bertrand Bellanger
|Renaissance
|2021
|
|-
| style="background:#0066cc;"| 77
|Seine-et-Marne
|Jean-François Parigi
|The Republicans
|2021
|
|-
| style="background:;"|78
|Yvelines
|Pierre Bédier
|The Republicans (France)
|2014
|
|-
| style="background:#adc1fd;"| 79
|Deux-Sèvres
|Coralie Dénoues
|Miscellaneous Right
|2021
|
|-
| style="background:#adc1fd;"| 80
|Somme
|Stéphane Haussoulier
|Miscellaneous Right
|2020
|
|-
| style="background:#ff8080;"| 81
|Tarn
|Christophe Ramond
|Socialist Party
|2015
|
|-
| style="background:#ff8080;"| 82
|Tarn-et-Garonne
|Michel Weill
|Socialist Party
|2021
|
|-
| style="background:#0066cc;"|83
|Var
|Marc Giraud
|The Republicans
|2015
|
|-
| style="background:#0066cc;"| 84
|Vaucluse
|Dominique Santoni
|The Republicans
|2021
|
|-
| style="background:#0066cc;"|85
|Vendée
|Alain Leboeuf
|The Republicans
|2021
|
|-
| style="background:#adc1fd;"|86
|Vienne
|Alain Pichon
|Miscellaneous Right
|2021
|
|-
| style="background:#ff8080;"| 87
|Haute-Vienne
|Jean-Claude Leblois
|Socialist Party
|2015
|
|-
| style="background:#0066cc;"|88
|Vosges
|François Vannson
|The Republicans
|2015
|
|-
| style="background:#0066cc;"| 89
|Yonne
|Patrick Gendraud
|The Republicans
|2017
|
|-
| style="background:#0066cc;"| 90
|Territoire de Belfort
|Florian Bouquet
|The Republicans
|2015
|
|-
| style="background:#0066cc;"| 91
|Essonne
|François Durovray
|The Republicans
|2015
|
|-
| style="background:#0066cc;"|92
|Hauts-de-Seine
|Georges Siffredi
|The Republicans
|2021
|
|-
| style="background:#ff8080;"| 93
|Seine-Saint-Denis
|Stéphane Troussel
|Socialist Party
|2012
|
|-
| style="background:#0066cc;"| 94
|Val-de-Marne
|Olivier Capitanio
|The Republicans
|2021
|
|-
| style="background:#0066cc;"| 95
|Val-d’Oise
|Marie-Christine Cavecchi
|The Republicans
|2017
|
|-
| style="background:;"|971
|Guadeloupe
|Guy Losbar
|United Guadeloupe, Socialism and Realities
|2021
|
|-
| style="background:;"|972
|Martinique
|Serge Letchimy
|Martinican Progressive Party
|2021
|
|-
| style="background:;"|973
|Guyane
|Alain Tien-Liong
|Decolonization and Social Emancipation Movement
|2008
|
|-
| style="background:#ffc0c0;"|974
|Réunion
|Cyrille Melchior
|Miscellaneous Left
|2017
|
|-
| style="background:;"|975
|Saint-Pierre-et-Miquelon (overseas collectivity)
|Bernard Briand
|Archipelago Tomorrow
|2021
|
|-
| style="background:#0066cc;"|976
|Mayotte
|Ben Issa Ousseni
|The Republicans
|2021
|
|}

Allowance 

References

External links
 General Description of French Local Government.
 CIA World Factbook
 Guide to Women Leaders
 French Departments

Presidents of French departments
 
Politics of France